"Almost Goodbye" is a song written by Billy Livsey and Don Schlitz, and recorded by American country music singer Mark Chesnutt.  It was released in August 1993 as the second single and title track from his 1993 album of the same name.  The power ballad peaked at number-one on the U.S. Billboard Hot Country Singles & Tracks (now Hot Country Songs) chart and at number 2 on the Canadian RPM Country Tracks chart.

Music video
The music video was directed by John Lloyd Miller and premiered in late 1993.

Chart performance
The song debuted at number 68 on the Hot Country Singles & Tracks chart dated September 4, 1993. It charted for 20 weeks on that chart, and became his fourth Number One single on the chart dated November 20, 1993, holding the top spot for one week.

Charts

Year-end charts

References

1993 songs
1993 singles
Mark Chesnutt songs
Songs written by Billy Livsey
Songs written by Don Schlitz
Song recordings produced by Mark Wright (record producer)
Music videos directed by John Lloyd Miller
MCA Records singles